

Events
Joe Masseria is arrested for burglary and extortion but is released on suspended sentence. 
Charles Luciano is arrested for shoplifting. 
April 17 – Joseph Petrosino arrests Neapolitan camorrista Don Enrico Alfano while investigating the Black Hand and holds him for deportation to Italy.
July – Upon the death of Michael Cassius McDonald, the Chicago crime lord's criminal operations are divided among his former lieutenants: Chicago alderman Jacob "Mont" Tennes, gambler "Big" Jim O'Leary and the Bud White Combine. However, three main factions arise as a bombing campaign to control the city's illegal gambling operations continues throughout the summer.

Births
Abe Reles [Abraham Reles] "Kid Twist", Murder, Inc. member and informant 
December 1 – Joseph Aiuppa "Joey Doves", Chicago Mafia leader

Organized crime
Years in organized crime